The 2001 Tour of the Basque Country was the 41st edition of the Tour of the Basque Country cycle race and was held from 9 April to 13 April 2001. The race started in Asteasu and finished at Lasarte-Oria. The race was won by Raimondas Rumšas of the Fassa Bortolo team.

General classification

References

2001
Bas